Welcome to Sweden is an American-Swedish sitcom television series created by comedian Greg Poehler, about an American accountant who quits his job to move with his girlfriend to her native country of Sweden. It premiered on TV4 on March 21, 2014. The series is based on Poehler's own experiences as a former intellectual property lawyer from the United States who moved with his girlfriend to her native country of Sweden in 2006. An international production featuring both Swedish and American talent, themes, and dialogue, it is the first English-language production by TV4. The series also aired in the United States on NBC.

On July 28, 2015, four episodes into season two, NBC cancelled the series due to what Poehler described as "craptastically" low ratings, with NBC further stating that production was "officially done". The remaining six episodes of season two were made available via online streaming at NBC's website.

Cast
Family
Greg Poehler as Bruce Evans, a generally easy-going and open-minded person, liberal by American standards in rebellion against his conservative upbringing, who experiences culture shock with his new life in Sweden
Josephine Bornebusch as Emma Wiik, a kind and caring, sharp-tongued, no-nonsense, independent-minded woman who helps Bruce as he adjusts to his new life, and tries to convince her family and friends that Bruce is the right man for her to settle down with
Lena Olin as Viveka Börjesson, Emma's warm but strong-willed and opinionated mother, who does not think that Bruce is the best man for her daughter
Claes Månsson as Birger Wiik, Emma's mild-mannered father, a retired sea captain
Christopher Wagelin as Gustav Wiik, Emma's blustery younger brother, a thirty-year old freeloader who frequently resorts to ill-advised shortcuts and schemes to avoid hard work
Per Svensson as Bengt Wiik, Birger's younger brother, who works at a video rental store, and is an obsessive fan of popular American movies
Illeana Douglas as housewife Nancy Evans, Bruce's mother, and Wayne Evans's wife
Patrick Duffy as Wayne Evans, Bruce's father, a small-town Midwestern American man, who sees Bruce's new life in Sweden as strange compared to Wayne's conservative Christian worldview

Other characters
Amy Poehler as Amy Poehler, a spoiled, self-involved, profligate American celebrity
Aubrey Plaza as Aubrey Plaza, a meddling, mischievous former client of Bruce's who is strangely minded to insinuate herself into Bruce's personal life
Magnus Mark as Olof, Emma's boss
Claes Ljungmark as Hans, CEO of the bank where Emma works
Basim Sabah Albasim as Hassan, an Iraqi immigrant displaced by the Iraq War
Jennie Silfverhjelm as Sofia, Emma's friend and colleague
Henrik Johansson as Karl, Sofia's boyfriend
Rachel Mohlin as Cecilia
Kodjo Akolor as Chuck Reed, a fun guy in Stockholm who works as a personal trainer
Madeleine Martin as a clerk at the café that Bruce frequents
Marques Ray as "Pepe", an assistant who works at Amy Poehler's office

Episodes

Season 1 (2014)
Season one is set in the summer, when Bruce first moves to Sweden. A successful money manager for wealthy celebrities, Bruce had happily lived in New York with his girlfriend Emma from Sweden, who he has been with for a year. Emma has moved back to Stockholm for a prestigious banking job, and Bruce is leaving New York to join her. This season follows the couple as Bruce, with no job and no friends, tries to deal with living in a new country with a different language and culture.

Season one of Welcome to Sweden is a co-production of Syskon, Entertainment One (eOne) Television, TV4, and FLX. It was written by Greg Poehler, Josephine Bornebusch, and Niclas Carlsson, and directed by Carl Åstrand (Lunatic Speed). It was executive produced by Amy Poehler (Syskon), Greg Poehler (Syskon), Frederik Arefalk (TV4), Carrie Stein (eOne), Pontus Edgren (FLX), and Felix Herngren (FLX). It was produced by Benjamin Thuresson (Lyckenisse Media), with US footage produced by Michelle Armour (Marobru). Eleonor Sager (FLX) and Josephine Bornebusch were associate producers.

TV4 signed on as a producer on May 8, 2013, and the first season began filming on May 13. It was picked up for distribution in the United States by NBC on October 8.

The first season of Welcome to Sweden broadcast in Sweden on TV4 between March 28 and May 14, 2014, airing Fridays before moving earlier in the week to Wednesdays beginning May 7. After achieving high ratings for its initial episodes, with 1.7 million viewers for the series premiere, Welcome to Sweden was granted a swift renewal by TV4, with the announcement for a ten-episode second season made at MIPTV 2014 in April 2014.

On July 10, 2014, the series began airing in the United States on NBC on Thursdays at 9:00 pm. and on The Comedy Network in Canada. For the US broadcasts, some of the scenes had to be edited, including dubbing over obscene dialogue and pixelating nudity. On August 4, after four episodes, NBC renewed the series for the second season. Although US ratings for the show were not considered particularly high in either total viewers or viewers in the 18-49 key demographic, NBC noted that the 18-49 viewership skewed to a more valuable upscale audience.

Season 2 (2015)
The second season begins in the winter, six months after Bruce first moved to Sweden, as he prepares to propose to Emma. The season follows their engagement as they deal with relatives, customs, and career transitions along the way. Filming for season two started in January 2015. The season aired Wednesdays in Sweden on TV4 from April 1 to June 3, 2015. It aired in the United States on NBC on Sundays at 8:00pm beginning July 19, 2015.

Season two is a co-production of Syskon, Entertainment One (eOne) Television, TV4, and Jarowskij. It was executive produced by Amy Poehler (Syskon), Greg Poehler (Syskon), Josephine Bornebusch, Iréne Lindblad (Jarowskij), Frederik Arefalk (TV4), Carrie Stein (eOne), Jessica Ericstam (TV4) and Lisa Dahlberg (TV4). Led by Ulf Kvensler, the writing staff also includes Greg Poehler, Peter Arrhenius, and new additions David Sundin and Bente Danielsson. Josephine Bornebusch bowed out of writing duties for season two due to her pregnancy. The season was produced by Johanna Bergenstråhle (Jarowskij). Episode directors for the season include Ulf Kvensler, Steffan Lindberg, and Lisa James Larsson.

Following its cancellation in the United States, the remaining episodes of the second season were streamed online through NBC's website and video on demand on August 5, 2015.

Note
A. The Swedish episode title is listed first, followed by the title used in the U.S. and Canada. The English titles are not necessarily translations of the Swedish ones.

Reception
The first season of Welcome to Sweden received positive reviews. On Rotten Tomatoes it has a rating 82%, based on 28 reviews, with an average rating of 6.6/10. The site's critical consensus reads, "Charming and smartly composed, Welcome to Sweden offers fun summer fare from the talented Poehler siblings despite its familiar tropes." On Metacritic the season has a score of 72 out of 100, based on 22 critics, indicating "generally favorable reviews".

Swedish reception controversy

In May 2014, a Swedish TV columnist gave the first season finale of Welcome to Sweden a negative review. In response, Greg Poehler subjected the columnist to online harassment, posting demeaning and offensive comments under an assumed name in the comments section. Due to the severity of the abuse, containing what was described as "personal attacks," the on-line news site traced the IP address to what was likely Poehler's own computer. Faced with the evidence, Poehler confessed and apologized.

Awards and nominations

International broadcast
In Indonesia, the series started on July 21, 2015 at 10:30 pm and can be seen on Star World with Indonesian subtitles. In Australia, the series premiered on The Comedy Channel on July 5, 2015.

In the United States, the series aired on NBC.

In Israel, it was broadcast on yes Oh.

References

External links
 at TV4 

Welcome to Sweden at NBC

2014 Swedish television series debuts
2015 Swedish television series endings
NBC original programming
TV4 (Sweden) original programming
Television series by Entertainment One
Television shows filmed in Sweden
Works about immigration to Europe
Sweden–United States relations